The United Kingdom is a sovereign state located off the north-western coast of continental Europe. It is the world's 7th largest island country. The mainland areas lie between latitudes 49°N and 59°N (the Shetland Islands reach to nearly 61°N), and longitudes 8°W to 2°E. The Royal Observatory, Greenwich, in south-east London, is the defining point of the Prime Meridian.

The UK lies between the North Atlantic and the North Sea, and comes within  of the north-west coast of France, from which it is separated by the English Channel. It shares a  international land boundary with the Republic of Ireland. The Channel Tunnel bored beneath the English Channel now links the UK with France.

The British Overseas Territories and Crown Dependencies are covered in their own respective articles, see below.

Area 
This makes it the 7th largest island country in the world. England is the largest country of the United Kingdom, at  accounting for just over half the total area of the UK. Wales and Northern Ireland are much smaller, covering  respectively.

The area of the countries of the United Kingdom is set out in the table below. Information about the area of England, the largest country, is also broken down by region.

The remaining twelve overseas territories cover an area .

Other countries with very similar land areas to the United Kingdom include Guinea (slightly larger), Uganda, Ghana and Romania (all slightly smaller). The UK is the world's 80th largest country by land area and the 10th largest in Europe (if European Russia is included).

Physical geography

The physical geography of the UK varies greatly. England consists of mostly lowland terrain, with upland or mountainous terrain only found north-west of the Tees–Exe line. The upland areas include the Lake District, the Pennines, North York Moors, Exmoor and Dartmoor. The lowland areas are typically traversed by ranges of low hills, frequently composed of chalk, and flat plains. Scotland is the most mountainous country in the UK and its physical geography is distinguished by the Highland Boundary Fault which traverses the Scottish mainland from Helensburgh to Stonehaven. The faultline separates the two distinctively different regions of the Highlands to the north and west, and the Lowlands to the south and east. The Highlands are predominantly mountainous, containing the majority of Scotland's mountainous landscape, while the Lowlands contain flatter land, especially across the Central Lowlands, with upland and mountainous terrain located at the Southern Uplands. Wales is mostly mountainous, though south Wales is less mountainous than north and mid Wales.

The overall geomorphology of the UK was shaped by a combination of forces including tectonics and climate change, in particular glaciation in northern and western areas.

The tallest mountain in the UK (and British Isles) is Ben Nevis, in the Grampian Mountains, Scotland. The longest river is the River Severn which flows from Wales into England. The largest lake by surface area is Lough Neagh in Northern Ireland, though Scotland's Loch Ness has the largest volume.

Geology 

The geology of the UK is complex and diverse, a result of it being subject to a variety of plate tectonic processes over a very extended period of time. Changing latitude and sea levels have been important factors in the nature of sedimentary sequences, whilst successive continental collisions have affected its geological structure with major faulting and folding being a legacy of each orogeny (mountain-building period), often associated with volcanic activity and the metamorphism of existing rock sequences. As a result of this eventful geological history, the UK shows a rich variety of landscapes.

Precambrian
The oldest rocks in the British Isles are the Lewisian gneisses, metamorphic rocks found in the far north-west of Scotland and in the Hebrides (with a few small outcrops elsewhere), which date from at least 2,700 Ma (Ma = million years ago). South and east of the gneisses are a complex mixture of rocks forming the North West Highlands and Grampian Highlands in Scotland. These are essentially the remains of folded sedimentary rocks that were deposited between 1,000 Ma and 670 Ma over the gneiss on what was then the floor of the Iapetus Ocean.

Palaeozoic
At 520 Ma, what is now Great Britain was split between two continents; the north of Scotland was located on the continent of Laurentia at about 20° south of the equator, while the rest of the country was on the continent of Gondwana near the Antarctic Circle. In Gondwana, England and Wales were largely submerged under a shallow sea studded with volcanic islands. The remains of these islands underlie much of central England with small outcrops visible in many places.

About 500 Ma southern Britain, the east coast of North America and south-east Newfoundland broke away from Gondwana to form the continent of Avalonia, which by 440 Ma had drifted to about 30° south. During this period north Wales was subject to volcanic activity. The remains of these volcanoes are still visible, one example of which is Rhobell Fawr dating from 510 Ma. Large quantities of volcanic lava and ash known as the Borrowdale Volcanics covered the Lake District and this can still be seen in the form of mountains such as Helvellyn and Scafell Pike.

Between 425 and 400 Ma Avalonia had joined with the continent of Baltica, and the combined landmass collided with Laurentia at about 20° south, joining the southern and northern halves of Great Britain together. The resulting Caledonian Orogeny produced an Alpine-style mountain range in much of north and west Britain.

The collision between continents continued during the Devonian period, producing uplift and subsequent erosion, resulting in the deposition of numerous sedimentary rock layers in lowlands and seas. The Old Red Sandstone and the contemporary volcanics and marine sediments found in Devon originated from these processes.

Around 360 Ma Great Britain was lying at the equator, covered by the warm shallow waters of the Rheic Ocean, during which time the Carboniferous Limestone was deposited, as found in the Mendip Hills and the Peak District of Derbyshire. Later, river deltas formed and the sediments deposited were colonised by swamps and rain forest. It was in this environment that the Coal Measures were formed, the source of the majority of Britain's extensive coal reserves.

Around 280 Ma the Variscan orogeny mountain-building period occurred, again due to collision of continental plates, causing major deformation in south-west England. The general region of Variscan folding was south of an east–west line roughly from south Pembrokeshire to Kent. Towards the end of this period granite was formed beneath the overlying rocks of Devon and Cornwall, now exposed at Dartmoor and Bodmin Moor.

By the end of the Carboniferous period the various continents of the Earth had fused to form the super-continent of Pangaea. Britain was located in the interior of Pangea where it was subject to a hot arid desert climate with frequent flash floods leaving deposits that formed beds of red sedimentary rock.

Mesozoic
As Pangaea drifted during the Triassic, Great Britain moved away from the equator until it was between 20° and 30° north. The remnants of the Variscan uplands in France to the south were eroded down, resulting in layers of the New Red Sandstone being deposited across central England.

Pangaea began to break up at the start of the Jurassic period. Sea levels rose and Britain drifted on the Eurasian Plate to between 31° and 40° north. Much of Britain was under water again, and sedimentary rocks were deposited and can now be found underlying much of England from the Cleveland Hills of Yorkshire to the Jurassic Coast in Dorset. These include sandstones, greensands, oolitic limestone of the Cotswold Hills, corallian limestone of the Vale of White Horse and the Isle of Portland. The burial of algae and bacteria below the mud of the seafloor during this time resulted in the formation of North Sea oil and natural gas

The modern continents having formed, the Cretaceous saw the formation of the Atlantic Ocean, gradually separating northern Scotland from North America. The land underwent a series of uplifts to form a fertile plain. After 20 million years or so, the seas started to flood the land again until much of Britain was again below the sea, though sea levels frequently changed. Chalk and flints were deposited over much of Great Britain, now notably exposed at the White Cliffs of Dover and the Seven Sisters, and also forming Salisbury Plain.

Cenozoic
Between 63 and 52 Ma, the last volcanic rocks in Great Britain were formed. The major eruptions at this time produced the Antrim Plateau, the basaltic columns of the Giant's Causeway and Lundy Island in the Bristol Channel.

The Alpine Orogeny that took place in Europe about 50 Ma, was responsible for the folding of strata in southern England, producing the London Basin syncline, the Weald-Artois Anticline to the south, the North Downs, South Downs and Chiltern Hills.

During the period the North Sea formed, Britain was uplifted. Some of this uplift was along old lines of weakness left from the Caledonian and Variscan Orogenies long before. The uplifted areas were then eroded, and further sediments, such as the London Clay, were deposited over southern England.

The major changes during the last 2 million years were brought about by several recent ice ages. This took place between about 478,000 to 424,000 years ago, and was responsible for the diversion of the River Thames onto its present course. During the most recent Devensian glaciation, which ended a mere 10,000 years ago, the icesheet reached south to Wolverhampton and Cardiff. Among the features left behind by the ice are the fjords of the west coast of Scotland, the U-shaped valleys of the Lake District and erratics (blocks of rock) that have been transported from the Oslo region of Norway and deposited on the coast of Yorkshire.

Amongst the most significant geological features created during the last twelve thousand years are the peat deposits of Scotland, and of coastal and upland areas of England and Wales.

At the present time Scotland is continuing to rise as a result of the weight of Devensian ice being lifted. Southern and eastern England is sinking, generally estimated at 1 mm ( in) per year, with the London area sinking at double the speed partly due to the continuing compaction of the recent clay deposits.

Mountains and hills

The ten tallest mountains in the UK are all found in Scotland. The highest peaks in each part of the UK are:
Scotland: Ben Nevis, 
Wales: Snowdon (Yr Wyddfa), (Snowdonia), 
England: Scafell Pike (Cumbrian Mountains), 
Northern Ireland: Slieve Donard (Mourne Mountains), 

The ranges of mountains and hills in the UK include:
Scotland: Cairngorms, Scottish Highlands, Southern Uplands, Grampian Mountains, Monadhliath Mountains, Ochil Hills, Campsie Fells, Cuillin
Wales: Brecon Beacons (Bannau Brycheiniog), Cambrian Mountains (Mynyddoedd Cambria), Clwydian Hills (Bryniau Clwyd), Snowdonia (Eryri), Black Mountains (Y Mynyddoedd Duon), Preseli Hills (Y Preseli)
England: Cheviot Hills, Chilterns, Cotswolds, Dartmoor, Lincolnshire Wolds, Exmoor, Lake District, Malvern Hills, Mendip Hills, North Downs, Peak District, Pennines, South Downs, Shropshire Hills, Yorkshire Wolds
Northern Ireland: Mourne Mountains, Antrim Plateau, Sperrin Mountains

Rivers and lakes
Main articles
List of lakes and lochs in the United Kingdom;
List of rivers of the United Kingdom;
List of waterfalls of the United Kingdom.

The longest river in the UK is the River Severn which flows through both Wales and England.

The longest rivers in the UK contained fully within each of its constituent nations are:
England: River Thames
Scotland: River Tay
N. Ireland: River Bann
Wales: River Usk

The largest lakes (by surface area) in the UK by country are:
N. Ireland: Lough Neagh
Scotland: Loch Lomond
England: Windermere
Wales: Bala Lake (Llyn Tegid)

Loch Ness is the UK's largest lake in terms of volume.

Artificial waterways
Main articles: Waterways in the United Kingdom, Canals of Great Britain, Dams and reservoirs in United Kingdom

As a result of its industrial history, the United Kingdom has an extensive system of canals, mostly built in the early years of the Industrial Revolution, before the rise of competition from the railways. The United Kingdom also has numerous dams and reservoirs to store water for drinking and industry. The generation of hydroelectric power is rather limited, supplying less than 2% of British electricity, mainly from the Scottish Highlands.

Coastline

Inlets
Cardigan Bay
Lyme Bay
Bristol Channel
Thames Estuary
Morecambe Bay
Solway Firth
The Wash
Humber Estuary
Firth of Forth
Firth of Tay
Moray Firth
Firth of Clyde
Firth of Lorn

Headlands
The geology of the United Kingdom is such that there are many headlands along its coast. A list of headlands of the United Kingdom details many of them.

Tidal flats

Islands

In total, it is estimated that the UK is made up of over one thousand small islands, the majority located off the north and west coasts of Scotland. About 130 of these are inhabited according to the 2001 Census.

The largest island in the UK is Great Britain.

Climate

The climate of the UK is generally temperate, although significant local variation occurs, particularly as a result of altitude and distance from the coast. In general the south of the country is warmer than the north, and the west wetter than the east. Due to the warming influence of the Gulf Stream, the UK is significantly warmer than some other locations at a similar latitude, such as Newfoundland.

The prevailing winds are southwesterly, from the North Atlantic Current. More than 50% of the days are overcast. There are few natural hazards, although there can be strong winds and floods, especially in winter.

In some years rainfall in Essex can be below , less than the average annual rainfall in Jerusalem and Beirut.

The lowest was  recorded at Braemar in the Grampian Mountains, Scotland, on 11 February 1895 and 10 January 1982 and Altnaharra, also in Scotland, on 30 December 1995.

Human geography

Demographics

Political geography

National government
The UK is governed as a whole by the Parliament of the United Kingdom. Of the four countries that make the UK, Scotland, Wales and Northern Ireland have devolved administrations and legislatures:
Northern Ireland – Northern Ireland Assembly
Scotland – Scottish Parliament
Wales – Senedd (Welsh Parliament)

The devolved administrations and legislatures can make laws in a number of areas, such as culture, education, local government, and environment.

By contrast, England has no devolved system of government, that is, the Parliament of the United Kingdom makes laws for England, as well as for reserved matters in Northern Ireland, Scotland and Wales. England is governed by UK government ministers and legislated for by the UK parliament. The London region has a devolved assembly but proposals for elected Regional Assemblies in England were rejected in the first referendum covering North East England. (See Government of England.)

The UK (specifically, Northern Ireland) has an international land boundary with the Republic of Ireland of 499 km. There is also a boundary between the jurisdiction of France and the UK on the Channel Tunnel.

Local government

Each part of the UK is subdivided into further local governmental regions:
England: Unitary Authorities, county councils, district councils, parish councils
Wales: Principal areas, communities
Scotland: Council areas, communities
Northern Ireland: Districts

Historically the UK was divided into counties or shires: administrative areas through which all civil responsibilities of the government were passed. Each county or shire had a county town as its administrative centre and was divided into individual parishes that were defined along ecclesiastic boundaries.

Between 1889 (1890 in Scotland) and 1974, the political boundaries were based on the traditional counties, but due to changes in population centres, the traditional counties became impractical as local government areas in certain highly urbanised areas. The Local Government Act 1972 created a new system of administrative counties, designed to take account of the widely differing populations across different parts of the country.

In the 1990s further population growth led to more political changes on a local level.  Unitary authorities were formed across the entirety of Scotland and Wales, and in larger cities in England. Many unpopular administrative counties were also abolished at this time, leading to a mixture of two-tier and single-purpose authorities. Further reorganisations are planned if and when regional assemblies in England are revisited in the future.

Economic geography

The economic geography of the UK reflects not only its current position in the global economy, but its long history both as a trading nation and an imperial power.

The UK led the industrial revolution and its highly urban character is a legacy of this, with all its major cities being current or former centres of various forms of manufacturing. However, this in turn was built on its exploitation of natural resources, especially coal and iron ore.

Primary industry
The UK's primary industry was once dominated by the coal industry, heavily concentrated in the north, the Midlands and south Wales. This is all but gone and the major primary industry is North Sea oil. Its activity is concentrated on the UK Continental Shelf to the north-east of Scotland.

Manufacturing
The UK's heavy manufacturing drove the industrial revolution. A map of the major UK cities gives a good picture of where this activity occurred, in particular Belfast, Birmingham, Glasgow, Liverpool, London, Manchester, Newcastle and Sheffield. Today there is no heavy manufacturing industry in which UK-based firms can be considered world leaders. However, areas of the UK still have a notable manufacturing base, including the Midlands which remains a strong manufacturing centre, and the North West which accounts for 60% of the United Kingdom's manufacturing output. More recently, high technology firms have concentrated largely along the M4 motorway, partly because of access to Heathrow Airport, but also because of agglomeration economies.

Finance and services
Once, every large city had a stock exchange. Now, the UK financial industry is concentrated overwhelmingly in the City of London and Canary Wharf, with back office and administrative operations often dispersed around the south of England. London is one of the world's great financial centres and is usually referred to as a world city. There is also a significant legal and ebusiness industry in Leeds.

Regional disparity
The effect of changing economic fortune has contributed to the creation of the so-called North-South divide, in which decaying industrial and ex-industrial areas of Northern England, Scotland and Wales contrast with the wealthy, finance and technology-led southern economy. This has led successive governments to develop regional policy to try to rectify the imbalance. However, this is not to say that the north–south divide is uniform; some of the worst pockets of deprivation can be found in London, whilst parts of Cheshire and North Yorkshire are very wealthy. Nor is the North-South divide limited to the economic sphere; cultural and political divisions weigh heavily too.

Natural resources

 

Historically, much of the United Kingdom was forested. Since prehistoric times, man has deforested much of the United Kingdom.

Agriculture is intensive, highly mechanised, and efficient by European standards, producing about 60% of food needs with only 1% of the labour force. It contributes around 2% of GDP. Around two thirds of production is devoted to livestock, one third to arable crops.

In 1993, it was estimated that land use was:
Arable land: 25%
Permanent crops: 0%
Permanent pastures: 46%
Forests and Woodland: 10%
Other: 19%
Irrigated: 1,080 km2

The UK has a variety of natural resources including:
Geological: coal, petroleum, natural gas, limestone, chalk, gypsum, silica, rock salt, china clay, iron ore, tin, silver, gold, lead.
Agricultural:  arable land, wheat, barley, sheep

The UK has large coal, natural gas, and oil reserves; primary energy production accounts for 10% of GDP, one of the highest shares of any industrial nation. Due to the island location of the UK, the country has great potential for generating electricity from wave power and tidal power, although these have not yet been exploited on a commercial basis.

Environment

Current issues

England is one of the most densely populated countries/regions in the world, and the most densely populated major nation in Europe. The high population density (especially in the southeast of England) coupled with a changing climate, is likely to put extreme pressure on the United Kingdom's water resources in the future.

The United Kingdom is reducing greenhouse gas emissions. It has met Kyoto Protocol target of a 12.5% reduction from 1990 levels and intends to meet the legally binding target of a 20% cut in emissions by 2010. By 2015, to recycle or compost at least 33% of household waste. Between 1998-99 and 1999–2000, household recycling increased from 8.8% to 10.3% respectively.

According to a 2018 survey for the World Wide Fund for Nature, the United Kingdom is one of the most nature-depleted countries in the world, coming in 189th place out of 218 countries.

International agreements
The United Kingdom is a party to many international agreements, including:
Air Pollution, Air Pollution-Nitrogen Oxides, Air Pollution-Sulphur 94, Air Pollution-Volatile Organic Compounds, Antarctic-Environmental Protocol, Antarctic-Marine Living Resources, Antarctic Seals, Antarctic Treaty, Biodiversity, Climate Change, Climate Change-Kyoto Protocol, Desertification, Endangered Species, Environmental Modification, Hazardous Wastes, Law of the Sea, Marine Dumping, Marine Life Conservation, Nuclear Test Ban, Ozone Layer Protection, Ship Pollution, Tropical Timber 83, Tropical Timber 94, Wetlands and Whaling.

The UK has signed, but not ratified, the international agreement on Air Pollution-Persistent Organic Pollutants.

Geography of dependent territories

Crown dependencies
Geography of the Isle of Man
Geography of the Channel Islands
Geography of Jersey
Geography of Guernsey
Geography of Alderney
 Geography of Sark
Geography of Herm

Overseas territories
Geography of Anguilla
Geography of Bermuda
Geography of the British Antarctic Territory
Geography of the British Indian Ocean Territory
Geography of the British Virgin Islands
Geography of the Cayman Islands
Geography of the Falkland Islands
Geography of Gibraltar
Geography of Montserrat
Geography of the Pitcairn Islands
Geography of Saint Helena, Ascension and Tristan da Cunha
Geography of South Georgia and the South Sandwich Islands
Geography of Akrotiri and Dhekelia
Geography of the Turks and Caicos Islands

See also

British Overseas Territories
City status in the United Kingdom
Conservation in the United Kingdom
Demographics of the United Kingdom
Extreme points of the United Kingdom
Centre points of the United Kingdom
Geography of England
Geography of Europe
Geography of Ireland
Geography of Scotland
Geography of Wales
List of caves in the United Kingdom
List of conurbations in the United Kingdom
List of places in the United Kingdom
North-South divide in the United Kingdom
Towns of the United Kingdom
Transport in the United Kingdom
 Rail transport in the United Kingdom

Notes

References

CIA Factbook
UK Government Statistics

External links

UK climate averages provided by the Meteorological Office
Ordnance Survey geofacts page